The Alpjuhorn is a mountain of the Bernese Alps, located north of Mund in Valais. It is situated on the ridge separating the Baltschiedertal and the Gredetschtal.

References

External links
 Alpjuhorn on Hikr

Mountains of the Alps
Alpine three-thousanders
Mountains of Switzerland
Mountains of Valais